Khar (X̌ār), also spelled Khaar, is the headquarters of the Bajaur District of Pakistan. Khar was one of the largest towns in the Federally Administered Tribal Areas (merged into Khyber Pakhtunkhwa province in 2018), and lies near the border with Afghanistan. Bajur scouts headquarters is also located in the town. Civil colony is located in this town and this place is the court of Bajour controlling by political agent.

History 
On October 30, 2006, Chenagai airstrike happened near Khar. Pakistani helicopter gunships fired missiles and destroyed an al-Qaeda-linked training facility and killed 80 local students of in a northwestern tribal area near the Afghan border, in a madrassa.

On December 25, 2010, at least 40 people were killed and at least 50 others were injured in the early morning after a woman threw two hand grenades and detonated her vest at a World Food Programme (WFP) distribution centre.

Population

Khar Population is about 130267 in 2017.

References 

Populated places in Bajaur District